Cuauhtémoc is a metro station on the Mexico City Metro Line 1. It is located at the northern extreme of Avenida Cuauhtémoc, in the Cuauhtémoc borough, in the center of Mexico City.

Name and pictogram
The station logo depicts the head of an eagle. The station, avenue, and borough were all named after the Aztec Emperor  Cuauhtémoc, whose name  means "descending eagle" in Nahuatl. The station receives its name due to being located at the intersection of Avenida Chapultepec and Avenida Cuauhtémoc, in the limits of the Juárez, Roma Norte, Centro and Doctores neighborhoods.

General information
This metro station is located near a number of landmarks, such as the up-market Roma and Juárez neighborhoods and the elegant tree-lined boulevard that is Paseo de la Reforma. Also nearby are two museums, the Ripley's Believe It or Not! museum and the Mexico City Wax Museum.

Ridership

Gallery

References

External links 
 

Mexico City Metro Line 1 stations
Mexico City Metro stations in Cuauhtémoc, Mexico City
Railway stations opened in 1969
1969 establishments in Mexico
Accessible Mexico City Metro stations